Trethomas railway station served the village of Trethomas, Caerphilly, Wales, from 1915 to 1962 on the Brecon and Merthyr Tydfil Junction Railway.

History 
The station opened on 4 January 1915 by the Brecon and Merthyr Tydfil Junction Railway, although it first appeared in Bradshaw in July of the same year. It closed on 31 December 1962. The site is now a cycle path.

References

External links 

Disused railway stations in Monmouthshire
Former Brecon and Merthyr Tydfil Junction Railway stations
Railway stations in Great Britain opened in 1915
Railway stations in Great Britain closed in 1962
1915 establishments in Wales
1962 disestablishments in Wales